A heating element converts electrical energy into heat through the process of Joule heating. Electric current through the element encounters resistance, resulting in heating of the element. Unlike the Peltier effect, this process is independent of the direction of current.

Heating elements types

Metal
Resistance wire: Metallic resistance heating elements may be wire or ribbon, straight or coiled. They are used in common heating devices like toasters and hair dryers, furnaces for industrial heating, floor heating, roof heating, pathway heating to melt snow, dryers, etc. The most common classes of materials used include:
 Nichrome: Most resistance wire heating elements usually use nichrome 80/20 (80% Nickel, 20% Chromium) wire, ribbon, or strip. Nichrome 80/20 is an ideal material, because it has relatively high resistance and forms an adherent layer of chromium oxide when it is heated for the first time.  Material beneath this layer will not oxidize, preventing the wire from breaking or burning out.
 Kanthal (FeCrAl) wires
 Cupronickel (CuNi) alloys for low temperature heating
 Etched foil: Etched foil elements are generally made from the same alloys as resistance wire elements, but are produced with a subtractive photo-etching process that starts with a continuous sheet of metal foil and ends with a complex resistance pattern.  These elements are commonly found in precision heating applications like medical diagnostics and aerospace.

Ceramic and semiconductor 
 Molybdenum disilicide (MoSi2) an intermetallic compound, a silicide of molybdenum, is a refractory ceramic primarily used in heating elements. It has moderate density, melting point 2030 °C (3686 °F) and is electrically conductive. At high temperatures it forms a passivation layer of silicon dioxide, protecting it from further oxidation. The  application area includes glass industry, ceramic sintering, heat treatment furnaces and semiconductor diffusion furnaces.
 Silicon carbide, see silicon carbide § heating elements .
 Silicon nitride, see silicon nitride in automotive industry . New generation hot surface igniter for gas furnace and diesel engine glow plug are made of silicon nitride material. Such heating element or glow plug reach a maximum temperature of 1400 °C and are quick to ignite gas, diesel or kerosene.
 PTC ceramic elements: PTC ceramic materials are named for their positive thermal coefficient of resistance (i.e., resistance increases upon heating). While most ceramics have a negative coefficient, these materials (often barium titanate and lead titanate composites) have a highly nonlinear thermal response, so that above a composition-dependent threshold temperature their resistance increases rapidly. This behavior causes the material to act as its own thermostat, since current passes when it is cool, and does not when it is hot. Thin films of this material are used in automotive rear-window defrost heaters, and honeycomb-shaped elements are used in more expensive hair dryers, space heaters and most modern pellet stove. Such heating element can reach a temperature of 950-1000 °C and are praised for the speed of temperature and stability.
 Quartz halogen infrared heaters are also used to provide Radiant heating.

Thick film heaters 

Thick film heaters are a type of resistive heater that can be printed on a thin substrate. Thick film heaters exhibit various advantages over the conventional metal-sheathed resistance elements. In general, thick film elements are characterized by their low profile form factor, improved temperature uniformity, quick thermal response due to low thermal mass, low energy consumption, high watt density and wide range of voltage compatibility. Typically, thick film heaters are printed on flat substrates, as well as on tubes in different heater patterns. These heaters can attain watt densities of as high as 100 W/cm2 depending on the heat transfer conditions. The thick film heater patterns are highly customizable based on the sheet resistance of the printed resistor paste.

These heaters can be printed on a variety of substrates including metal, ceramic, glass, polymer using metal/alloy-loaded thick film pastes. The most common substrates used to print thick film heaters are aluminum 6061-T6, stainless steel and muscovite or phlogopite mica sheets. The applications and operational characteristics of these heaters vary widely based on the chosen substrate materials. This is primarily attributed to the thermal characteristics of the heater substrate.

There are several conventional applications of thick film heaters. They can be used in griddles, waffle irons, stove-top electric heating, humidifiers, tea kettles, heat sealing devices, water heaters, clothes irons and steamers, hair straighteners, boilers, 3D printer heated beds, thermal print heads, glue guns, laboratory heating equipment, clothes dryers, baseboard heaters, warming trays, heat exchangers, deicing/defogging devices for car windshields, side mirrors, etc., refrigerator defrosting, etc.

For most applications, the thermal performance and temperature distribution are the two key design parameters. In order to avoid any hotspots and to maintain a uniform temperature distribution across a substrate, the circuit design can be optimized by changing the localized power density of the resistor circuit. An optimized heater design helps to control the heater output and modulate the local temperatures across the heater substrate. In cases where there is a requirement of 2 or more heating zones with different output power over a relatively small area, a thick film heater can be designed to achieve a zonal heating pattern on a single substrate.

Thick film heaters can largely be characterized under two subcategories- negative temperature coefficient (NTC) or positive temperature coefficient (PTC) based on the effect of temperature increase on the element's resistance. The NTC type heaters are characterized by a decrease in resistance as the heater temperature increases and thus have a higher output power at higher temperatures for a given input voltage. The PTC heaters behave in an opposite manner with an increase of resistance and decreasing heater power at elevated temperatures. This characteristic of the PTC heaters make them self regulating too, as their output power saturates at a fixed temperature. On the other hand, NTC type heaters generally require a thermostat or a thermocouple in order to control the heater runaway. These heaters are used in applications which require a quick ramp-up of heater temperature to a predetermined set-point as they are usually faster acting than the PTC type heaters.

Polymer PTC heating elements 

Resistive heaters can be made of conducting PTC rubber materials where the resistivity increases exponentially with increasing temperature. Such a heater will produce high power when it is cold, and rapidly heat up itself to a constant temperature. Due to the exponentially increasing resistivity, the heater can never heat itself to warmer than this temperature. Above this temperature, the rubber acts as an electrical insulator. The temperature can be chosen during the production of the rubber.

It is a point-wise self-regulating heater and self-limiting heater. Self-regulating means that every point of the heater independently keeps a constant temperature without the need of regulating electronics. Self-limiting means that the heater can never exceed a certain temperature in any point and requires no overheat protection.

Liquid 
An electrode boiler uses electricity flowing through streams of water to create steam.

Composite heating elements 

 Tubular (sheathed) elements normally comprise a fine coil of nichrome (NiCr) resistance heating alloy wire, that is located in a metallic tube (of copper or stainless steel alloys such as Incoloy) and insulated by magnesium oxide powder.  To keep moisture out of the hygroscopic insulator, the ends are equipped with beads of insulating material such as ceramic or silicone rubber, or a combination of both.  The tube is drawn through a die to compress the powder and maximize heat transmission.  These can be a straight rod (as in toaster ovens) or bent to a shape to span an area to be heated (such as in electric stoves, ovens, and coffee makers).
 Screen-printed metal–ceramic tracks deposited on ceramic insulated metal (generally steel) plates have found widespread application as elements in kettles and other domestic appliances since the mid-1990s.
 Radiative heating elements (heat lamps): A high-powered incandescent lamp usually run at less than maximum power to radiate mostly infrared instead of visible light. These are usually found in radiant space heaters and food warmers, taking either a long, tubular form or an R40 reflector-lamp form. The reflector lamp style is often tinted red to minimize the visible light produced; the tubular form comes in different formats:
 Gold coated - Made famous by the patented Phillips Helen lamp.  A gold dichroic film is deposited on the inside that reduces the visible light and allows most of the short and medium wave infrared through.  Mainly for heating people. A number of manufacturers now manufacture these lamps and they improve constantly.
 Ruby coated - Same function as the gold-coated lamps, but at a fraction of the cost. The visible glare is much higher than the gold variant.
 Clear - No coating and mainly used in production processes.
 Removable ceramic core elements use a coiled resistance heating alloy wire threaded through one or more cylindrical ceramic segments to make a required length (related to output), with or without a centre rod. Inserted into a metal sheath or tube sealed at one end, this type of element allows replacement or repair without breaking into the process involved, usually fluid heating under pressure.

Combination heating element systems 
 Heating elements for high-temperature furnaces are often made of exotic materials, including platinum,  tungsten disilicide/molybdenum disilicide, molybdenum (vacuum furnaces) and silicon carbide. Silicon carbide hot surface igniters, which are heating elements designed for igniting flammable gas, are common in gas ovens and clothes dryers. Laser heaters are also being used for achieving high temperatures.

See also 
 Heated hose
 Heating mantle
 Positive temperature coefficient
 Thermoelectric effect

References

Heating